This is a list of the songs that reached number one in Mexico in 1980, with data provided by Radio Mil as published on the Billboard and Notitas Musicales magazines. Radio Mil had provided both magazines with charts for many years, however Billboard stopped regularly publishing their charts on September, so for continuity reasons the Notitas Musicales number-ones are also included in this article.

Chart history (Billboard)

Chart history (Notitas Musicales)
Unlike Billboard, Notitas Musicales was a bi-weekly magazine, and instead of publishing a single, general chart, Notitas published two separate charts on every issue:
"Canciones que México canta" ("Songs that Mexico sings"), which listed the Top 10 most popular Spanish-language songs in Mexico, and
"Hit Parade", which was a Top 10 of the most popular songs in Mexico  that were in languages other than Spanish.

See also
1980 in music

References

Sources
Print editions of the Billboard magazine.

1980 in Mexico
Mexico
1980